Jurášek  is a 1957 Czechoslovak drama film, directed by Miroslav Cikán. It stars  Karel Hašler jr., Vladimir Gulyaev, and Karel Höger.

References

1957 films
Czechoslovak drama films
1957 drama films
Films directed by Miroslav Cikán
Czech war films
Czech children's films
Czech resistance to Nazi occupation in film
Czech World War II films
Czechoslovak World War II films
1950s Czech films